These are the Canadian number-one country albums of 1998, per the RPM Country Albums chart.

1998
Canada Country Albums
Number-one country albums